Martin Walker (27 July 1901 – 18 September 1955) was a British stage and screen actor. Walker appeared in films for over thirty years from 1922 onwards, largely in supporting roles but occasionally as a lead such as in Help Yourself (1932). He also wrote and directed a short film Hide and Seek in 1922. Walker's final film appearance was The Belles of St. Trinian's in 1954.

Selected filmography
 A Bill of Divorcement (1922)
 The Flying Fool (1931)
 Help Yourself (1932)
 Mimi (1935)
 Lieut. Daring R.N. (1935)
 Sanders of the River (1935) 
 The Drum (1938)
 Murder in Soho (1939)
 Hell's Cargo (1939)
 Love on the Dole (1941)
 This England (1941)
 The Night Invader (1943)
 Lisbon Story (1946)
 The Woman in the Hall (1947)
 Black 13 (1953)
 The Belles of St. Trinian's (1954)

References

Bibliography
 Low, Rachael. Filmmaking in 1930s Britain. George Allen & Unwin, 1985.
 Sutton, David R. A Chorus of Raspberries: British Film Comedy 1929-1939. University of Exeter Press, 2000.

External links

1901 births
1955 deaths
British male film actors
Male actors from London
20th-century British male actors